Eric Ritchie, better known as Licorice, is a Canadian professional League of Legends player for Golden Guardians of the League Championship Series (LCS). Prior to competing in the LCS, Ritchie played for LCS Challenger teams, such as Cloud9 Challenger and Team eUnited. Ritchie signed with Cloud9 ahead of the 2018 NA LCS season; in his rookie season, he was won the league's Rookie of the Split award and reached the semifinals at the 2018 League of Legends World Championship. He made his second World Championship appearance in 2019, and in 2020, he won the LCS championship. After six splits with the team, ahead of the 2021 season, Ritchie was traded to FlyQuest. He was transferred to the Golden Guardians in the middle of the 2021 Summer split.

Professional career

Pre–LCS
Early in his career, in 2016, Richie played for Cloud9 Challenger in the League of Legends Challenger Series, as a substitute. In December 2016, Challengers Series team eUnited bought out Richie's contract from Cloud9.

Cloud9

In late 2017, Ritchie signed with Cloud9, as their starting top laner on the main roster for the 2018 NA LCS season. He entered his rookie season as the replacement for Cloud9's former top laner Jeong "Impact" Eon-yeong and made his LCS debut in January 2018. At the end of the Spring Split, Richie won the league's Rookie of the Split award. In the Summer Split, Ritchie and Cloud9 reached the semifinals, where they faced Team Liquid; however, they lost the match, 0–3. Cloud9 qualified for the 2018 World Championship as North America's third seed, where Ritchie helped the team reach their best international finish in the organization's history, reaching the semifinals. At the end of the year, Ritchie was invited to the 2018 All-Star Event as one of three North American representatives.

The following season, Richie was named to the 2019 LCS Spring Split All-Pro first team. Richie missed two weeks of the 2019 Summer Split due to a wrist injury, however despite the missed games, he was named to the LCS All-Pro second team at the end of the split. Cloud9 reached the 2019 LCS Summer Split finals, marking the second LCS finals appearance for Richie; the team lost to Team Liquid in the finals by a score of 2–3.  Cloud9 qualified for the 2019 World Championship, marking the second time Ritchie had attended the World Championship.

In the 2020 Spring Split, Richie and Cloud9 finished the regular season with a  record, tying an LCS record. The team went on to sweep FlyQuest, 3–0, in the LCS finals, giving Richie his first LCS title. Ritchie, alongside the entire Cloud9 roster, was named to the All–Pro first team, although Richie was the only member of Cloud9 to not be in the top-10 voting for the Spring Split Most Valuable Player award. The following split, Ritchie was named to the LCS All-Pro first team and was a nominee for the splits MVP award. However Cloud9 fell early in the playoffs, and for the first time in his LCS career, Richie did not qualify for Worlds.

After the 2020 season, Cloud9 announced that they would be retaining their entire roster for the 2021 LCS season; however, after LEC Star Luka "Perkz" Perković became available for trade, he was subsequently acquired by Cloud9 in October 2020, and Academy player Fudge was promoted to the starting lineup, replacing Ritchie in the toplane.

FlyQuest
In November 2020, FlyQuest bought out Richie's contract from Cloud9 for a reported . Through the 2021 Spring Split and half of the 2021 Summer Split, FlyQuest amassed only a 9–24 record, with Ritchie posting the worst kill-death ratio among all LCS players up until July in the Summer Split.

Golden Guardians
In July 2021, FlyQuest sold Ritchie's contract to Golden Guardians, who had a 8–25 record at that point in the season. At the time of signing, Golden Guardians also agreed to extend his contract through the 2023 season. Golden Guardians had an improved win rate after the acquisition of Richie, finishing the season with a 14–31 record.

References 

Living people
1990s births
Canadian esports players
Cloud9 (esports) players
FlyQuest players
Golden Guardians players
League of Legends top lane players
Year of birth missing (living people)